Chris Evert was the defending champion and won in the final 7–6, 6–4 against Arantxa Sánchez.

Seeds
A champion seed is indicated in bold text while text in italics indicates the round in which that seed was eliminated.

  Chris Evert (champion)
  Manuela Maleeva (quarterfinals)
  Claudia Kohde-Kilsch (first round)
  Zina Garrison (first round)
  Katerina Maleeva (quarterfinals)
  Sylvia Hanika (quarterfinals)
  Isabel Cueto (second round)
  Judith Wiesner (first round)

Draw

References
 1988 Eckerd Open Draw

1988 WTA Tour
1988 in sports in Florida
1988 in American tennis